Miguel Aldana Ibarra (born 1940 - 17 October 2021) was a Mexican police and former director of Interpol in Mexico who was indicted in the United States for the killing of DEA agent Enrique Camarena.

As of 2022, he was wanted by the DEA. He died on 17 October 2021 of a heart attack.

References

External links 

 Obituary with bio and favorable opinion by a Mexican jounalist (In Spanish)

Living people
Interpol officials
Fugitives wanted on murder charges
1940 births